Ribeiro is a surname common in Galicia, Portugal and Brazil. It is also a wine-making region of Southeast central Galicia. In Portuguese, it literally means "small creek" or "by the river". In Galicia the surname was often Castilianized as Riveiro.

Adriano Leite Ribeiro (born 1982), Brazilian football striker
Aguinaldo Ribeiro (born 1969), Brazilian politician
Alfonso Ribeiro (born 1971), American actor/game show host
Alexandre Ribeiro (born 1981), Brazilian jiu-jitsu practitioner and mixed martial artist
Alípio de Miranda-Ribeiro (1874-1939), Brazilian herpetologist and ichthyologist
Ana Ribeiro (born 1955), Uruguayan historian, writer, and professor
Anderson Ribeiro (born 1981), Brazilian football player
André Ribeiro (1966–2021), Brazilian racing driver
Antonio Ribeiro (soccer) (born 1980), Canadian football (soccer) player
António Ribeiro (1928–1998), Catholic cardinal from Portugal
Áureo Ribeiro (born 1979), Brazilian politician
Bernard Ribeiro, Baron Ribeiro (born 1944), British surgeon
Bernardim Ribeiro (1482–1552), Portuguese poet
Bruno de Paula Ribeiro Ingrácia (born 1983), otherwise known as Bruno Ribeiro, Brazilian footballer
Bruno Ribeiro (born 1975), Portuguese footballer
Catherine Ribeiro (born 1941), French singer
Christian Ribeiro (born 1989), Welsh footballer
Darcy Ribeiro, (born 1922), Brazilian anthropologist
Diogo Ribeiro (cartographer) (or Diego Ribero) (16th century), Portuguese cartographer and explorer
Édson Ribeiro (born 1972), Brazilian sprinter
Edson Ribeiro, Brazilian musician
Fernando Ribeiro, Portuguese singer
Gilvan Ribeiro (born 1989), Brazilian canoeist
João Mário Ribeiro (born 1929), Portuguese chess master
Jorge Ribeiro (born 1981), Portuguese footballer
Julio Francis Ribeiro (born 1929), former Indian police officer and civil servant
Lais Ribeiro (born 1990), a Brazilian model
Miguel Ribeiro (born 1974), Portuguese screenwriter and filmmaker
Mike Ribeiro (born 1980), Canadian hockey player
Pedro Júlio Marques Ribeiro (born 1979), Portuguese footballer
Pedro Manuel Mendes Ribeiro (born 1983), Portuguese footballer
Pedro Ribeiro (Brazilian footballer) (born 1990), Brazilian footballer
Pery Ribeiro (1937–2012), Brazilian singer
Robert Ribeiro (born 1949), Hong Kong judge
Sheila Ribeiro (born 1973), artist
Wladimir Ribeiro (born 1967), Brazilian swimmer

See also
Ribeiro (DO), the Spanish wine-producing region in Galicia

Portuguese-language surnames